Feminazi is a pejorative term for feminists that was popularized by politically conservative American radio talk show host Rush Limbaugh.

Origin and usage
Feminazi is a portmanteau of the nouns feminist and Nazi. According to The Oxford Dictionary of American Political Slang, it refers (pejoratively) to "a committed feminist or a strong-willed woman". The American conservative radio talk show host Rush Limbaugh, who popularized the term, credited the university professor Thomas Hazlett with coining it. Limbaugh began to use the term in 1991.

Limbaugh, who was vocally critical of the feminist movement, stated that the term feminazi refers to "radical feminists" whose goal is "to see that there are as many abortions as possible", a small group of "militants" whom he characterized as having a "quest for power" and a "belief that men aren't necessary". Limbaugh distinguished these women from "well-intentioned but misguided people who call themselves 'feminists. However, the term came to be widely used for feminism as a whole.

The term is used to characterize feminist perspectives as extreme in order to discredit feminist arguments, portraying feminists as bossy, misandric, and hating femininity. It has been used in mainstream American discourse to erroneously portray women as hyper-vigilant to perceived sexism.

In Australia, the term gained wider use following the 1995 publication of the book The First Stone, and has been used in popular media to characterize feminists as threatening, "vindictive", and "puritanical".

Reactions
Limbaugh stated that feminazis, as opposed to mainstream feminists, are those "who are happy about the large number of abortions we have" in the United States. The anti-violence educator Jackson Katz argues that "no such feminists exist", and that feminazi is a "clever term of propaganda" that is intended and used to "[bully] into complicit silence women who might otherwise challenge men's violence". In his book Angry White Men, the sociologist Michael Kimmel says the term is used to attack feminist campaigns for equal pay and safety from rape and domestic violence by associating them with Nazi genocide.

According to Helen Lewis, deputy editor of the New Statesman, "the idea of conflating a liberation movement with Nazism is just deeply ignorant. It’s self-undermining, because it’s so over the top." Laura Bates, the founder of the Everyday Sexism Project, has said that "It’s a desperate attempt to demonise us, and it’s frustrating, because if it wasn’t such an offensive word, you could actually start to embrace it and own it".

Steinem has suggested a boycott of Limbaugh for his use of the term, stating, "Hitler came to power against the strong feminist movement in Germany, padlocked the family planning clinics, and declared abortion a crime against the stateall views that more closely resemble Rush Limbaugh's".

According to The New Partridge Dictionary of Slang and Unconventional English, Limbaugh used the term "to marginalize any feminist as a hardline, uncompromising manhater", and The New York Times has described it as "one of [Limbaugh's] favorite epithets for supporters of women's rights". Toril Moi writes that Limbaugh's terminology reflects commonplace ideas that feminists "hate men", are "dogmatic, inflexible, and intolerant", and constitute "an extremist, power-hungry minority". The activist Gloria Steinem writes, "I've never met anyone who fits that description [of wanting as many abortions as possible], though [Limbaugh] lavishes it on me among many others".

Aftereffects
Limbaugh's words prompted a shift in the public perception of feminism across the American political spectrum starting in the mid-1990s, according to Toril Moi, who writes that Americans came to see feminists as dogmatic and power-hungry women who hate men and who are incapable of challenging their own assumptions; though the term feminazi may have been created to describe a small group of particular feminists, it calcified into a stereotype of all feminists or all women. Moi writes that feminism became "the F-word," a label that women hesitated to claim for themselves lest they be seen as feminazis, even among those who agreed with the goals of feminism.

In the 2010s, there were prominent efforts to re-claim the word feminism from the stereotype of the feminazi. These included a performance at 2014 MTV Video Music Awards in which Beyoncé displayed a large lighted sign of the word feminist, together with a definition of feminism by Chimamanda Ngozi Adichie. Feminist news blogs like Jezebel and Feministing reintroduced support for feminism into mainstream journalism.

See also 
 Antifeminism

References

Further reading

External links

 
 Google Trends for "feminazi"

The Rush Limbaugh Show
Political neologisms
Criticism of feminism
1980s neologisms
Stereotypes of women
Pejorative terms for women
Nazi analogies